Endrit Braimllari is an Albanian politician, member of Socialist Movement for Integration (Albanian: Lëvizja Socialiste për Integrim, LSI), General Secretary of LSI and the Chairman of LSI of Tirana.

Politics 
Since December 2016 he has served as General Secretary of LSI, elected during the Party's National Convention. He is also the Chairman of Tirana, elected on the Convention of Tirana in February 2016.

External links 
 Official LSI Website

References 

1988 births
Living people
Politicians from Tirana
Socialist Movement for Integration politicians